60S ribosomal protein L26 is a protein that in humans is encoded by the RPL26 gene.

Function 

Ribosomes, the organelles that catalyze protein synthesis, consist of a small 40S subunit and a large 60S subunit. Together these subunits are composed of 4 RNA species and approximately 80 structurally distinct proteins. This gene encodes a ribosomal protein that is a component of the 60S subunit. The protein belongs to the L24P family of ribosomal proteins. It is located in the cytoplasm. As is typical for genes encoding ribosomal proteins, there are multiple processed pseudogenes of this gene dispersed through the genome and the human paralog RPL26L1.

Interactions 

RPL26 has been shown to interact with Mdm2.

See also 
Eukaryotic translation
60S ribosomal subunit

References

Further reading

External links 
 PDBe-KB provides an overview of all the structure information available in the PDB for Human 60S ribosomal protein L26 

Ribosomal proteins